Junior Sibande (born 26 June 1993 in Daveyton, Gauteng) is a South African football player who last played as a left back or centre back for Ajax Cape Town F.C. in the National First Division.

Career
On 17 August 2019 it was confirmed, that Sibande had joined Ajax Cape Town.

References

External links

1993 births
Living people
People from Daveyton
South African soccer players
Association football defenders
University of Pretoria F.C. players
Highlands Park F.C. players
Cape Town Spurs F.C. players
South African Premier Division players
National First Division players
Sportspeople from Gauteng